XLC or xlc may refer to:

 Hypersonic XLC, a defunct roller coaster located at Kings Dominion in Doswell, Virginia
 xlc, the ISO 639-3 code for Lycian language, Anatolia